Dolovo may refer to:

 Dolovo (Pančevo), village in Serbia, in the municipality of Pančevo 
 Dolovo (Tutin), village in Serbia, in the municipality of Tutin
 Dolova (Croatia), village in Croatia, on Krk island, also known as Dolovo